"Hip Hopper" is a song by American rapper Blac Youngsta featuring fellow American rapper Lil Yachty. It was released on February 7, 2017, as the lead single from Blac's mixtape Illuminati. It was later included on his debut studio album 223.

Music video 
The music video for the track was released on June 7, 2017. It features Blac Youngsta and Lil Yachty at a retirement home.

Critical reception 
A writer for HotNewHipHop said the track had "a ridiculously infectious vibe", and that it was "partially due to the light and fun production provided by Mike Will Made It".

Charts

Certifications

References 

2017 singles
2017 songs
Blac Youngsta songs
Lil Yachty songs
Songs written by Lil Yachty
Songs written by Mike Will Made It
Song recordings produced by Mike Will Made It
Epic Records singles